Gymnagnostus is a genus of trilobite in the order Agnostida, which existed in what is now Oaxaca, Mexico. It was described by Robison and Pantoja-Alor, in 1968, and the type species is Gymnagnostus gongros.

References

Agnostidae
Fossils of Mexico
Paleozoic life of Newfoundland and Labrador